Someone to Love You is the second studio album by American R&B duo Ruff Endz. It was released on May 14, 2002, via Epic Records. Recording sessions took place from 2001 to 2002 at Lobo Recording Studio, at Sony Music Studios, at the Weight Room Studios, at Right Track Studios and at Big Noise Studios in New York, at KC Productions Recording Studio in Washington, D.C., at Ardent Studios in Memphis, Tennessee, and at Vanguard Studios in Detroit. Production was handled by Nate Clemons, Mike Clemons, Cory Rooney, Troy Oliver, C. Cole, Dan Shea, Frank Johnson, Night & Day, Seven, the Characters and Ruff Endz. It peaked at number 27 on the Billboard 200 and number 8 on the Top R&B/Hip-Hop Albums chart.

A music video for the album's lead single, "Cash, Money, Cars, Clothes" featuring Memphis Bleek, was directed by Simón Brand. The album's second single, "Someone to Love You", was released to Mainstream Urban, Rhythmic and Urban AC radio on February 11, 2002. It peaked at number 49 on the Billboard Hot 100, while the music video for the track debuted on B.E.T.'s 106 & Park on March 18, 2002.

Track listing

Charts

References

External links

2002 albums
Ruff Endz albums
Epic Records albums
Albums produced by Cory Rooney